Kamennyye Klyuchi is a rural locality (a village) in Chernushinsky District, Perm Krai, Russia. The population was 164 as of 2010. There are 2  streets.

Geography 
Kamennyye Klyuchi is located 16 km west of Chernushka (the district's administrative centre) by road. Rakino is the nearest rural locality.

References 

Rural localities in Chernushinsky District